Franco Sancassani (born 12 April 1974) is an Italian rower. He is the brother of fellow rower and World Championships gold medalist Elisabetta Sancassani.

Biography
Sancassani was part of the team which finished fourth at the 2000 Summer Olympics. He largely specialises in lightweight and sculls events and has won nine gold medals at the World Rowing Championships. In 2013 he was awarded the Lifetime Achievement Award at Oscar del remo (awards honouring Italian rowers).

References

External links 
 
 

1974 births
Living people
Italian male rowers
Sportspeople from Lecco
Olympic rowers of Italy
Rowers at the 2000 Summer Olympics
World Rowing Championships medalists for Italy
Italian sky runners
Rowers of Marina Militare
European Rowing Championships medalists